The Cherry Hill Alternative High School (also known as the Estelle Malberg Alternative High School or simply Malberg) is an alternative public high school in Cherry Hill in Camden County, New Jersey, United States, for students who need behavioral and emotional support. Malberg, as it is commonly known to most Cherry Hill residents, is also the location of the Cherry Hill Public Schools administration building, which was previously at the Rosa Administration Building (formerly Heritage Middle School until 1985 and was renamed Rosa International Middle School in 1999). Malberg was built in 1969 and was originally an early childhood center, then became an alternative high school in 1997.

As of the 2021–22 school year, the school had an enrollment of 32 students and 7.0 classroom teachers (on an FTE basis), for a student–teacher ratio of 4.6:1. There were 9 students (28.1% of enrollment) eligible for free lunch and none eligible for reduced-cost lunch.

Awards, rankings and recognition
The school was recognized as a New Jersey School of Character in 2013 and as a National School of Character in 2014 by the Character Education Partnership.

References

External links

School website
Cherry Hill Public Schools

Cherry Hill Alternative High School, National Center for Education Statistics

1969 establishments in New Jersey
Alternative schools in the United States
Cherry Hill, New Jersey
Educational institutions established in 1969
Public high schools in Camden County, New Jersey